In physics, coefficients of fractional parentage (cfp's) can be used to obtain anti-symmetric many-body states for like particles. In a jj-coupling scheme they are defined by the following relation.

 

The state  is normalized and totally anti-symmetric with respect to permutations of all its  particles, while the state  is normalized and totally anti-symmetric with respect to all its  particles.

Mathematical physics